Parnassius nosei  is a high-altitude butterfly found in China.
It is a member of the snow Apollo genus Parnassius of the swallowtail family, Papilionidae.
The taxonomic status of this butterfly is uncertain. Some authors  regard nosei as a subspecies of Parnassius maharaja.

References
Weiss, J.-C. 1992. The Parnassiinae of the World. Part 2. Sciences Nat, Venette; 87 pp.
Chou, I. (ed) 1994. Monographia Rhopalocerorum Sinensium (Monograph of Chinese Butterflies). Henan Scientific and Technological Publishing House, Zhengzhou.(in Chinese)

External links
Parnassius of the World Text and photos.

nosei
Butterflies described in 1989